The 1975 Wayne State Tartars football team represented Wayne State University as a member of the Great Lakes Intercollegiate Athletic Conference (GLIAC) during the 1975 NCAA Division II football season. In their second year under head coach Dick Lowry, the Tartars compiled an 8–3 record (3–1 against GLIAC opponents) and won the GLIAC championship.

Schedule

References

Wayne State
Wayne State Warriors football seasons
Great Lakes Intercollegiate Athletic Conference football champion seasons
Wayne State Tartars football